The Moving Picture Company (MPC) is a British multinational company providing visual effects, CGI, animation, motion design and other services for the film, TV, brand experience and advertising industries.

Their artists have produced Academy Award Winning work for films including 1917, The Jungle Book and The Life of Pi.

MPC is part of Technicolor Creative Studios. It is headquartered in London with facilities located in Los Angeles, New York City, Montreal, Amsterdam, Bangalore, Paris, Berlin and Shanghai.

History

Founding
MPC was established by Mike Luckwell in 1970, starting as a production company producing TV commercials and in 1974 the studio began delving into video, acquiring broadcast standard video recorders and TV cameras. MPC continued to grow; moving into video post-production and by 1983 was known for post-production and visual effects for the advertising and feature film industries.

Luckwell sold MPC to Carlton Communications in 1983 and in doing so; he became Carlton's managing director and largest individual shareholder. During Carlton's 2004 merger with Granada to create ITV London, they sold MPC to French group Thomson SA for £52.7 million. Following the acquisition, Thomson, now known as Technicolor SA, aimed to make MPC grow by acquiring more film work. By the end of the decade, MPC has become one of the leading visual effects companies.

Expansion
MPC Film has grown from a small team in London to more than 3000 employees worldwide.

In 2007, MPC Film created a new facility in Vancouver, where a core team – some originally from London and others native to Vancouver, began work on Zack Snyder’s Watchmen. Since then, MPC Vancouver has worked on a number of feature films including Skyscraper, Alpha and Fantastic Beasts and Where to Find Them. However, the Vancouver office announced its closure in 2019.

Summer 2008 saw the opening of MPC LA, a commercials post shop operating in Santa Monica, California. They have since completed jobs for commercials directors including Fredrik Bond, Filip Engstrom and Traktor as well as completing Super Bowl spots.

Around the same time as opening in Santa Monica, MPC Digital came into being, to create and re-purpose digital assets for the internet as well as new media applications and hand held devices. The MPC Datalab offered a service to manage digital acquisition and establish tapeless HD workflows.

After eight years at its Santa Monica location, MPC moved to a larger 25,000-square-foot studio in Culver City. MPC Film launched creative services in the studio including concept and production design, visualization, business development, virtual production and VFX Supervisor representation. MPC Advertising has resources dedicated to VFX, colour and finishing services. The space also plays host to a purpose-built VR/AR infrastructure and its content production arm, MPC Creative.

MPC Bangalore officially opened in October 2010. Being plugged into MPC's pipeline and production network, MPC Bangalore is able to share software development and in-house tools.

At the start of 2011, MPC NYC was officially opened in SoHo, offering a range of integrated services and provides Color Grading and Digital, Design and Production Services across the US markets.

MPC Film also opened a studio in Montreal in 2013 and has since worked on feature films including, Alien: Covenant, Blade Runner 2049, Ghost in the Shell, The Greatest Showman, The Revenant and The Martian.
The studio received an Academy Award nomination for one of its first films X-Men: Days of Future Past.

Notable people, sponsors, and projects

Long-time collaborators
Over the past 50 years, MPC Film has worked with many notable directors and VFX supervisors. Directors including Tim Burton, Ridley Scott, Zack Snyder, Jon Favreau, David Yates and Kenneth Branagh have worked with MPC on many of their projects.

Ridley Scott has worked with MPC on a wide range of his films including Robin Hood, Prometheus and The Martian, the latter receiving Academy Award, BAFTA and VES nominations.

For Jon Favreau's 2016 remake of The Jungle Book, a team of more than 800 computer graphics artists worked for over a year, animating over 54 species of animal, crafting full CG environments, and simulating earth, fire and water. 224 unique animals were created and new computer programs were created to better simulate muscles, skin and fur. For each shot and each movement, animation artists followed extensive research in animal behavior, so that even the subtlest behavioral traits would translate into performances the audience would recognize from the animal kingdom. Most recently, MPC worked on Disney’s The Lion King with Jon Favreau directing. MPC's VFX supervisors are Adam Valdez and Elliot Newman.

Tim Burton has worked with MPC since the early 2000s, on projects including Corpse Bride, Sweeney Todd: The Demon Barber of Fleet Street, Charlie and the Chocolate Factory, Dark Shadows and Dumbo.

MPC has also collaborated with Zack Snyder, including; Watchmen, Sucker Punch, Man of Steel, Batman V Superman: Dawn of Justice and Justice League.

MPC represents VFX supervisors including Erik Nash, Richard Stammers, Adam Valdez and Nick Davis.

MPC's most frequent sponsors include: Sony, Coca-Cola, Warner Bros., Disney, HBO, Samsung, NBCUniversal, BMW, Hennessy, and Paramount Global.

Digital humans
MPC’s work on digital humans includes work on Rachael for Blade Runner 2049 and Arnold Schwarzenegger for Terminator Genisys where the T-800 is in the form of a 1984 Arnold Schwarzenegger.

MPC has a R&D lab, named “Shadow Lab”, developing a number of different new technologies, including digital humans.

Genesis
In recent years, Technicolor's R&I team worked with MPC's R&D division to create a virtual production platform called Genesis; Genesis is MPC's Virtual Production platform.

Accolades
MPC was awarded three Academy Awards for its work on the films 1917, The Jungle Book, Life of Pi and three BAFTA Awards for its work on 1917 The Jungle Book and Harry Potter and the Deathly Hallows: Part 2. MPC has also received VES Awards for The Lion King, The Jungle Book, The Lone Ranger, Life of Pi and Kingdom of Heaven.

Filmography

Film - 1980s and 1990s

Film - 2000s

Film - 2010s

Film - 2020s

Film - Upcoming

Television series
The Invisible Man (1984)
The Vampyr: A Soap Opera (1992)
Merlin (1998)
Invasion: Earth (1998)
The Strangerers (2000)
Band of Brothers (2001)
Colosseum: Rome's Arena of Death (2004)
Egypt (2005)
Terry Pratchett's Hogfather (2006)
Terry Pratchett's The Colour of Magic (2008)
Boardwalk Empire (2012)
Game of Thrones (2014)
Halo (2022)
Prehistoric Planet (2022)
Ms. Marvel (2022)

Music videos

Portishead, "Sour Times" (1994)
Spiritualized, "Come Together" (1998)
Cevin Fisher, "Burning Up" (1998)
Idlewild, "Actually It's Darkness" (2000)
Tori Amos, "Strange Little Girl" (2001)
Kylie Minogue, "Can't Get You Out of My Head" (2001)
Basement Jaxx, "Where's Your Head At" (2001)
Madonna, "Die Another Day" (2002)
Moloko, "Familiar Feeling" (2003)
Maksim, "Flight of the Bumblebee" (2003)
Busted, "Sleeping with the Light On" (2003)
I Am Kloot, "3 Feet Tall" (2003)
Muse, "Time Is Running Out" (2003)
Summer Matthews, "Little Miss Perfect" (2003)
Dizzee Rascal, "Jus' a Rascal" (2003)
Mark Joseph, "Bringing Back Those Memories" (2004)
Basement Jaxx, "Plug It In" (2004)
Brian McFadden, "Real to Me" (2004)
Brian McFadden, "Irish Son" (2004)
Beck, "E-Pro" (2005)
The Dead 60s, "Riot Radio" (2005)
Rob Thomas, "This Is How a Heart Breaks" (2005)
LCD Soundsystem, "Tribulations" (2005)
Test Icicles, "Circle. Square. Triangle" (2005)
Sugababes, "Push the Button" (2005)
Franz Ferdinand, "Walk Away" (2005)
Massive Attack, "Live with Me" (2006)
Laura Michelle Kelly, "There Was a Time" (2006)
Richard Ashcroft, "Music Is Power" (2006)
Serena-Maneesh, "Drain Cosmetics" (2006)
The Sunshine Underground, "I Ain't Losing Any Sleep" (2006)
Gomez, "See the World" (2006)
Badly Drawn Boy, "Nothing's Going to Change" (2006)
Razorlight, "America" (2006)
The Killers, "Bones" (2006)
Baxter Dury, "Francesca's Party" (2006)
Klaxons, "Golden Skans" (2006)
Bloc Party, "The Prayer" (2006)
Kano, "Feel Free" (2007)
These New Puritans, "Elvis" (2007)
Depeche Mode, "Wrong" (2009)
Coldplay, "Strawberry Swing" (2009)
Depeche Mode, "Personal Jesus 2011" (2011)
The Temper Trap, "Trembling Hands" (2012)
Jessie Ware, "Wildest Moments" (2012)
The Killers, "Miss Atomic Bomb" (2012)
Flight Facilities, "Clair de Lune" (2012)
Biffy Clyro, "Black Chandelier" (2012)
Police Dog Hogan, "Devil Jim" (2012)
Miles Kane, "Give Up" (2013)
Bastille, "Pompeii" (2013)
Bleached, "Next Stop" (2013)
Gabrielle Aplin, "Panic Cord" (2013)
Jamie Cullum, "Everything You Didn't Do" (2013)
Miley Cyrus, "We Can't Stop" (2013)
Jessie J, "It's My Party" (2013)
Paloma Faith, "Can't Rely on You" (2014)
Tiny Ruins, "Carriages" (2014)
Chet Faker, "Gold" (2014)
Shabazz Palaces, "#Cake" (2014)
Flying Lotus featuring Kendrick Lamar, "Never Catch Me" (2014)
Childish Gambino, "Telegraph Ave. ("Oakland" by Lloyd)" (2014)
Benjamin Clementine, "Nemesis" (2015)
Childish Gambino, "Sober" (2015)
Taylor Swift, "Style" (2015)
Earl Sweatshirt, "Grief" (2015)
Brandon Flowers, "Lonely Town" (2015)
Hyphen Hyphen, "Just Need Your Love" (2015)
Mumford & Sons, "The Wolf" (2015)
U2, "Song for Someone" (2015)
Baauer, "Day Ones" (2016)
Massive Attack, "Take It There" (2016)
Michael Kiwanuka, "Black Man in a White World" (2016)
Adele, "Send My Love (To Your New Lover)" (2016)
Clean Bandit featuring Louisa Johnson, "Tears" (2016)
Two Door Cinema Club, "Are We Ready? (Wreck)" (2016)
Shawn Mendes, "Mercy" (2016)
The Rolling Stones, "Ride Em' on Down" (2016)
Coldplay, "Everglow" (2017)
Michael Kiwanuka, "Cold Little Heart" (2017)
A Tribe Called Quest, "Dis Generation" (2017)
Kendrick Lamar, "Element" (2017)
Mashrou' Leila, "Roman" (2017)
Khalid, "Saved" (2017)
Migos, "Stir Fry" (2018)
Halsey, "Sorry" (2018)
Niall Horan, "On the Loose" (2018)
Sigrid, "Raw" (2018)
Jack White, "Over and Over and Over" (2018)
Leon Bridges, "Bad Bad News" (2018)
Leon Bridges, "Bet Ain't Worth the Hand" (2018)
Gaz Coombes, "Walk the Walk" (2018)
Jess Glynne, "I'll Be There" (2018)
Childish Gambino, "This Is America" (2018)
Sam Smith, "Pray" (2018)
Plan B, "Guess Again" (2018)
Dita Von Teese, "A Musical Film" (2018)
Nothing But Thieves, "Forever & Ever More" (2018)

See also
 Industrial Light & Magic
 Sony Pictures Imageworks
 Wētā FX
 Wētā Workshop
 Rhythm & Hues
 Animal Logic
 Pacific Data Images
 Blue Sky Studios
 Framestore
 Digital Domain
 DNEG
 Image Engine
 Visual Works

References

External links
 

Visual effects companies
Mass media companies established in 1970
Companies based in the City of Westminster
Film production companies of the United Kingdom
1974 establishments in England
Technicolor Creative Studios